In mathematics, a pullback bundle or induced bundle is the  fiber bundle that is induced by a map of its base-space. Thus  is the disjoint union of all these fibers equipped with a suitable topology.

Formal definition

Let  be a fiber bundle with abstract fiber  and let  be a continuous map. Define the pullback bundle by

and equip it with the subspace topology and the projection map  given by the projection onto the first factor, i.e.,

The projection onto the second factor gives a map

such that the following diagram commutes:

If  is a local trivialization of  then  is a local trivialization of  where

The map  is then a bundle morphism covering .

Properties

  for  all  .

If the bundle  has structure group  with transition functions  (with respect to a family of local trivializations ) then the pullback bundle  also has structure group .

If  is a vector bundle or principal bundle then so is the pullback .

It then follows that the map  covering  is equivariant and so defines a morphism of principal bundles.

In the language of category theory, the pullback bundle construction is an example of the more general categorical pullback. As such it satisfies the corresponding universal property.

The construction of the pullback bundle can be carried out in subcategories of the category of topological spaces, such as the category of smooth manifolds. The latter construction is useful in differential geometry and topology.

Bundles and sheaves

Bundles may also be described by their sheaves of sections. The pullback of bundles then corresponds to the inverse image of sheaves, which is a contravariant functor. A sheaf, however, is more naturally a covariant object, since it has a pushforward, called the direct image of a sheaf. The tension and interplay between bundles and sheaves, or inverse and direct image, can be advantageous in many areas of  geometry. However, the direct image of a sheaf of sections of a bundle is not in general the sheaf of sections of some direct image bundle, so that although the notion of a 'pushforward of a bundle' is defined in some contexts (for example, the pushforward by a diffeomorphism), in general it is better understood in the category of sheaves, because the objects it creates cannot in general be bundles.

References

Sources

Further reading

Fiber bundles